Phrenapatinae is a subfamily of darkling beetles in the family Tenebrionidae. There are more than 20 genera in Phrenapatinae, grouped into 3 tribes.

Genera
These genera belong to the subfamily Phrenapatinae:

 Afrotagalus Gebien, 1942
 Aphtora Bates, 1872
 Archaeoglenes Broun, 1893
 Archeophthora Kaszab, 1978
 Clamoris Gozis, 1886
 Cleolaus Champion, 1886
 Daochus Champion, 1886
 Delognatha Lacordaire, 1859
 Dioedus Leconte, 1862
 Endroeditagalus Schawaller & Bouchard, 2019
 Exechophthalmus Ardoin, 1974
 Falsotagalus Kaszab, 1977
 Leleupium Kaszab, 1956
 Madagassa Koch, 1950
 Molion Champion, 1886
 Nanotagalus Gebien, 1942
 Neotagalus Kaszab, 1955
 Peneta Lacordaire, 1859
 Phrenapates Gray, 1831
 Pseudophthora Kaszab, 1970
 Pycnochilus C.O. Waterhouse, 1879
 Scolytocaulus Fairmaire, 1896
 Sepilokus Iwan & Ras, 2020
 Tagalinus Kaszab, 1977
 Tagalopsis Kaszab, 1955
 Taiwanotagalus Masumoto, 1982
 Telchis Champion, 1886
 Zypoetes Champion, 1893

References

Further reading

 
 

Tenebrionoidea